Only an Orchard Away was the first album by the British band Box Codax; a band from Glasgow, Scotland. It is made up of Nick McCarthy of the alternative rock band Franz Ferdinand, Manuela Gernedel, and Alexander Ragnew. The album was a limited edition was released on 4 September 2006, by TheThinMan Records in the UK. It included a CD in a gatefold card format and a vinyl edition. On 2 October 2006, Gomma Records released the album in mainland Europe and the rest of the world.

The lo-fi album has been received by critics both as a total joke and as serious 'art' music. The critic Keri Kennedy concludes the album's review with: "Box Codax aren't meant for the masses, they'll either confuse or delight, depending on your state of mind."

Track listing

References

External links
Box Codax's official band website

2006 albums